This is a list of schools in the Chittagong Division

Schools located on the island of Sandwip in the Chittagong District of the Chittagong Division are included in a separate list at List of schools in Sandwip.

Chandpur District
Hasan Ali Govt. High School,Chandpur Sadar
Matripith Govt. Girls High School,Chandpur Sadar
Ruhiter Par D.M. High School, Matlab Uttar, Chandpur

Chittagong District

Comilla District

Cox's Bazar District

Feni District

Lakshmipur District

Noakhali District

Rangamati District

Khagrachari District

References

Schools in Chittagong
Chittagong
Chittagong-related lists